Azad Kashmir Day is celebrated in Azad Kashmir on 24 October each year. It commemorates the date of establishment of the state in 1947.

See also 

 Hurriyat and Problems before Plebiscite
 Syed Ali Shah Geelani
 2014 Jammu and Kashmir Legislative Assembly election

References

External links
The Subjective manner of Kashmir Dispute

Kashmir conflict
Public holidays in Pakistan
Culture of Azad Kashmir
October observances